Major General John Huston Church (June 28, 1892 – November 3, 1953) was a senior officer in the United States Army. He fought in World War I, World War II and in the Korean War. During the latter conflict, he provided assistance to the South Korean Army in the opening days of the war. He later commanded the 24th Infantry Division while it was engaged in the Battle of the Pusan Perimeter.

Early life
John Huston Church was born in the town of Glen Iron in Pennsylvania, on June 28, 1892. From 1915 until 1917, he was a student at New York University. After the American entry into World War I, Church volunteered for the United States Army and was commissioned as a second lieutenant. He served on the Western Front with the 28th Infantry Regiment, part of the 1st Division of the American Expeditionary Force (AEF). He was wounded twice, and was awarded a Distinguished Service Cross for heroism in action at the Battle of Cantigny.

At the end of the war, Church decided to continue with his service in the army. He was aide-de-camp to Brigadier General F. C. Marshall in 1920 and, having been promoted to captain, a post as an instructor with the National Guard in Maryland followed. From 1933 to 1936, he served in the Philippines. In 1936, and by now a major, he returned to the United States to attend the Command and General Staff School for two years.  He later served with the Arizona National Guard as an instructor. In October 1940, he became the assistant chief of staff for operations of the 45th Infantry Division.

World War II
After the United States entered World War II in December 1941, Church was appointed chief of staff, of the 45th Infantry Division. He served with the division until late 1943, rising to assistant division commander (ADC), during which time it was involved in the Allied invasion of Sicily, numerous battles in the Italian Campaign, and Operation Dragoon, the Allied invasion of southern France. At one stage, Church held a regimental command, when from late 1943 to mid-1944, he led the 157th Infantry Regiment.

In September 1944, Church was promoted to the one-star general officer rank of brigadier general and posted to the 84th Infantry Division as its ADC. Church was wounded again as his division took part in the advance from the Netherlands to the Elbe River towards the end of the war.

Postwar
A year after the war ended, Church became the commander of the Infantry Replacement Training Center at Fort McClellan, Alabama. He was given the same post at Fort Jackson, South Carolina, where he later took command of the 5th Infantry Division. From 1948 until 1949 Church served as the deputy chief of Army Field Forces at Fort Monroe, Virginia. In 1950, he was serving in General Douglas MacArthur's headquarters in Tokyo as a section chief.

Korean War
When the communist North Korean Army invaded South Korea on June 25, 1950, MacArthur sent Church to lead a survey team of staff officers to work with Ambassador Muccio and the Korean Military Advisory Group (KMAG) and assess what assistance could be provided to the South Korean Army. This task resulted in the establishment of GHQ Advance Command and Liaison Group (ADCOM) at Suwon. Arriving in Korea on June 27, in his role as commander of ADCOM, Church worked with the Chief of Staff of the South Korean Army, General Chae Byeong-deok, to improve the South Korean defensive arrangements. Despite his efforts, Seoul was captured by the North Koreans on 28 June and Church recommended the deployment of at least two combat teams of U.S. personnel to help stabilise the situation. This prompted MacArthur to undertake his own survey in Korea the following day and after a further report from Church, he committed U.S. forces to Korea, having received permission from President Harry Truman to do so.

Accordingly, the 24th Infantry Division, which was stationed in Japan as part of the U.S. Eighth Army, was the first army unit sent over from Japan under the command of Major General William F. Dean. A reinforced company of the division, commanded by Lieutenant Colonel Brad Smith, was sent north from Pusan to try to halt the North Koreans. Meeting with Smith at Taejon, Church informed him "All we need is some men up there who won't run when they see tanks", and instructed Smith to make his stand at Osan. Task Force Smith was without tank support and had faulty communications, and was promptly overrun in its first engagement with the North Koreans. Dean gathered his troops in the city of Taejon and formed a strong defense. After a stubborn fight, the American troops retreated. Dean got separated from his troops and was captured. On July 22, Church, without a command following the dissolution of ADCOM, was given command of the division.

His new command, which had less 10,000 men, was withdrawn to Daegu to rest, but then Lieutenant General Walton Walker, the commander of the U.S. Eighth Army, decided that he needed the 24th to guard the southwest sector, known as the Naktong Bulge, of the Pusan Perimeter. On 6 August, during the subsequent battle, the North Korean 4th Division inflicted more losses on Church's division, breaking though its 34th Infantry Regiment. He had believed initially that the attack was just a probe and only belatedly requested reinforcements from Walker, who had few reserves. Finally, Church, by now promoted to major general, was able to regroup his men and by 18 August had largely destroyed the North Korean division, with the help of a brigade of marines.

Frail and suffering from arthritis, Church remained in command of the 24th until January 25, 1951. His health meant that he was not often in the field and Lieutenant General Matthew Ridgway, commander of the U.S. Eighth Army following the death of Walker in December 1950, considered this was detrimental to the state of the division. Ridgway relieved Church of his command and replaced him with Brigadier General Blackshear M. Bryan. Church was awarded the Army Distinguished Service Medal for his leadership of the 24th Division while in Korea.

Later life

Church subsequently was appointed commandant of the U.S. Army Infantry School at Fort Benning, Georgia and served in that capacity until his retirement from the military in June 1952. He died on 3 November 1953 in Washington, D.C. Survived by his wife, he was buried at Arlington National Cemetery, in Arlington, Virginia.

References

Bibliography

External links

Generals of World War II
United States Army Officers 1939–1945

|-

|-

1892 births
1953 deaths
United States Army Infantry Branch personnel
United States Army Command and General Staff College alumni
United States Army personnel of World War I
United States Army personnel of the Korean War
People from Union County, Pennsylvania
Recipients of the Distinguished Service Cross (United States)
Recipients of the Distinguished Service Medal (US Army)
Recipients of the Silver Star
Burials at Arlington National Cemetery
United States Army generals of World War II
United States Army generals
Military personnel from Pennsylvania